Bisalpur Assembly constituency is one of the 403 constituencies of the Uttar Pradesh Legislative Assembly, India. It is a part of the Pilibhit district and one of the five assembly constituencies in the Pilibhit Lok Sabha constituency. First election in this assembly constituency was held in 1957 after the "DPACO (1956)" (delimitation order) was passed in 1956. After the "Delimitation of Parliamentary and Assembly Constituencies Order" was passed in 2008, the constituency was assigned identification number 130.

Wards  / Areas
Extent of Bisalpur Assembly constituency is KCs Deoria Kalan, Bisalpur, Bilsanda, Amrata, Bisalpur NPP & Bilsanda NP of Bisalpur Tehsil.

Members of the Legislative Assembly

Election results

2022 

source: Election Commission of India

2017

See also
Pilibhit district
Pilibhit Lok Sabha constituency
Sixteenth Legislative Assembly of Uttar Pradesh
Uttar Pradesh Legislative Assembly
Vidhan Bhawan

References

External links
 

Assembly constituencies of Uttar Pradesh
Pilibhit district
Constituencies established in 1956